Mohokare Local Municipality is an administrative area in the Xhariep District of the Free State in South Africa. The name is a Sesotho word for Caledon River, which runs through the municipality.

Main places
The 2011 census divided the municipality into the following main places:

Politics 

The municipal council consists of eleven members elected by mixed-member proportional representation. Six councillors are elected by first-past-the-post voting in six wards, while the remaining five are chosen from party lists so that the total number of party representatives is proportional to the number of votes received. 

In the 2021 South African municipal elections the African National Congress (ANC) won a majority of eight seats on the council.

The following table shows the results of the 2021 election.

References

External links
 http://www.mohokare.gov.za/

Local municipalities of the Xhariep District Municipality